Baroda Developmental Screening Test is a screening test for motor-mental assessment of infants, developed from Bayley Scales of Infant Development. It is meant to be used by child psychologists rather than physicians.
It can be applied up to 30 month of age.kit is commercially available for it.

History
The test was developed by Promila Phatak in 1991 at Department of Child Development, University of Baroda.

See also
 Denver Developmental Screening Test
 Goodenough-Harris Draw-A-Person Test
 Trivandrum Developmental Screening Chart

References

Pediatrics
Screening and assessment tools in child and adolescent psychiatry